Kamenny Karyer is a rural locality (a selo) in Otvazhnensky Selsovet of Arkharinsky District, Amur Oblast, Russia. The population was 111 in 2018. There is 1 street.

Geography 
Kamenny Karyer is located 18 km south of Arkhara (the district's administrative centre) by road. Tatakan is the nearest rural locality.

References 

Rural localities in Arkharinsky District